Dorcadion kaimakcalanum is a species of beetle in the family Cerambycidae. It was described by Jurecek in 1929. It is known from Greece and Macedonia. It contains the varietas Dorcadion kaimakcalanum var. jureceki.

References

kaimakcalanum
Beetles described in 1929